The 2001 Philippine Basketball Association (PBA) All-Filipino Cup was the first conference of the 2001 PBA season. It started on January 28 and ended on May 18, 2001. The tournament is an All-Filipino format, which doesn't require an import or a pure-foreign player for each team.

Format
The following format will be observed for the duration of the conference:
The teams were divided into 2 groups.

Group A:
Alaska Aces
Barangay Ginebra Kings
San Miguel Beermen
Shell Turbo Chargers
Sta. Lucia Realtors

Group B:
Batang Red Bull Thunder
Mobiline Phone Pals
Pop Cola Panthers
Purefoods TJ Hotdogs
Tanduay Rhum Masters

 Teams in a group will play against each other once and against teams in the other group twice; 14 games per team.  
 The top eight teams after the eliminations will advance to the quarterfinals.
Quarterfinals:
Top four teams will have a twice-to-beat advantage against their opponent.
QF1: #1 vs. #8
QF2: #2 vs. #7
QF3: #3 vs. #6
QF4: #4 vs. #5
Best-of-five semifinals:
SF1: QF1 vs. QF4
SF2: QF2 vs. QF3
Third-place playoff: losers of the semifinals
Best-of-seven finals: winners of the semifinals

Elimination round

Team standings

Bracket

Quarterfinals

(1) Shell vs. (8) Mobiline

(2) San Miguel vs. (7) Red Bull

(3) Pop Cola vs. (6) Alaska

(4) Purefoods vs. (5) Barangay Ginebra

Semifinals

(1) Shell vs. (5) Barangay Ginebra

(2) San Miguel vs. (3) Pop Cola

Third place playoff

Finals

References

External links
 PBA.ph

All-Filipino Cup
PBA Philippine Cup